Red-legged frog is a common name for several species of frog:
 California red-legged frog, Rana draytonii, a frog endemic to California, United States
 La Selle red-legged frog, Eleutherodactylus furcyensis, a frog found in the Dominican Republic and Haiti
 Northern red-legged frog, Rana aurora, a frog found in Canada and the United States
 Red-legged running frog, Kassina maculata, a frog endemic to Africa

Amphibian common names
Frogs